The 1991 UST Glowing Goldies men's basketball team represented University of Santo Tomas in the 54th season of the University Athletic Association of the Philippines. The men's basketball tournament for the school year 1991–92 began on July 20, 1991, and the host school for the season was the University of the Philippines.

Despite the 7-foot EJ Feihl's departure from the team, the Goldies began their season on a five-game winning streak. They ended the double round-robin eliminations tied with the FEU Tamaraws at second place in the standings with 11 wins against three losses. They lost against the Tamaraws in the playoff for the second Finals berth, 89–95. UST had trailed FEU by as much as 23 points in the first half and were outrebounded, 23–35.

Second-year forward Dennis Espino was selected to Mythical team at the tournament's presentation of awards.

Roster

Depth chart

Roster changes

Subtractions

Additions

Schedule and results

UAAP games 

Elimination games were played in a double round-robin format. All games were aired on RPN 9 by Silverstar Sports.

Postseason tournaments 

Notes

Awards

Players drafted into the PBA 
Billy Reyes was drafted 20th overall in the third round of the 1994 PBA draft by the Chot Reyes-led Coney Island Ice Cream Stars on January 16, 1994.

References 

UST Growling Tigers basketball team seasons